The Butuan City Council consists of 13 members - One Vice Mayor, 10 Elected Councilors, One ABC-Liga Federation President, and One Sangguniang Kabataan President.

Legislative Members

Vice Mayor/Presiding Officer (1)

 Jose S. Aquino II (2nd Term)

Elected City Councilors (10)
 Joseph Omar O. Andaya (2nd Term)
 Atty. Rema E. Burdeos (3rd Term) 
 Cherry Mae G. Busa (2nd Term) 
 Atty. Glenn C. Carampatana (2nd Term)
 Ferdinand E. Nalcot (3rd Term) 
 Cromwell P. Nortega (2nd Term) 
 Derrick A. Plaza (3rd Term) 
 Engr. Vincent Rizal C. Rosario (2nd Term) 
 Atty. Ehrnest John C. Sanchez (2nd Term) 
 Atty. John Gil S. Unay, Sr. (2nd Term)

Duties and Responsibilities

Committee Chairmanship (2016-Present)

Committee Table 1
Source: 14th Sangguniang Panlunsod Committee Chairmanship

Past and Present Legislative Members

References

External links
 Butuan Government Website

See also
 Legislative districts of Agusan del Norte

Councilors